Troop Sport also known as World Of Troop or just, TROOP was a clothing company founded in 1985 by two Jewish brothers, Teddy and Harvey Held, and a Korean, William Kim. The clothing line was intended to target young men in urban areas, particularly those who were Latino and African-American.

The company went bankrupt and had its reputation hurt after rumors spread that company was actually owned by the Ku Klux Klan (similar rumors have been made about popular companies such as drink company Snapple and shoe company Timberland as well), and that the name stood for "To Rule Over Oppressed People." Additional rumors claimed that rapper LL Cool J appeared on "The Oprah Winfrey Show" urging viewers to protest the company.

The rumors about the connection to the Klan hurt sales and the company declared bankruptcy several years later. These rumors were categorically false, with Held saying that they were "blackmail" from competition.  By the early 90s, Troop was gone from the American market, although it enjoyed a longer life in Europe throughout the 90s through a licensee.

Over the years, the brand grew a cult following as retro style became hot again and vintage pieces would go for big money on eBay. The brand exchanged ownership numerous times through failed comeback attempts and licensee deals in the early 2000s, and in 2008, Grammy Award winning artist Nelly obtained the TROOP apparel license. In 2014, the brand was purchased outright and the brand has been relaunched in 2015. The brand has reissued T-shirts and original leather jackets in addition to the footwear.

References

External links 
 Official website

Defunct manufacturing companies of the United States
Clothing brands of the United States
Clothing companies established in 1985
Sportswear brands
Athletic shoe brands
Conspiracy theories involving race and ethnicity